The 2011 Coca-Cola GM was the 41st edition of the Greenlandic Men's Football Championship. The final round was held in Sisimiut from August 14 to 20. It was won by G-44 Qeqertarsuaq for the second time in its history.

Qualifying stage

North Greenland
FC Malamuk and Eqaluk-56 qualified for the final Round.

Disko Bay

NB Some match results are unavailable.

Central Greenland

NB Some match results are unavailable. Siumut Amerdlok Kunuk qualified for the final Round as hosts.

South Greenland
Kissaviarsuk-33 and Nagtoralik Paamiut qualified for the final Round.

Playoff round
Tupilak-41 qualified for the final Round, after winning the playoff round against the North Greenland Third place club.

Final round

Pool 1

Pool 2

Playoffs

Semi-finals

Ninth Place Match

Seventh-place match

Fifth-place match

Third-place match

Final

See also
Football in Greenland
Football Association of Greenland
Greenland national football team
Greenlandic Men's Football Championship

References

Greenlandic Men's Football Championship seasons
Green
Green
 football